Hugo Dahmer (7 May 1918 – 1 August 2006) was a German Luftwaffe ace and recipient of the Knight's Cross of the Iron Cross during World War II.  The Knight's Cross of the Iron Cross was awarded to recognise extreme battlefield bravery or successful military leadership.  Hugo Dahmer was credited with anywhere between 45 - 57 victories.  In 1956 he joined the Bundeswehr and retired in 1974 as an Oberstleutnant.

Summary of career

Aerial victory claims
According to US historian David T. Zabecki, Dahmer was credited with 57 aerial victories.

Awards
 Aviator badge
 Front Flying Clasp of the Luftwaffe
 Ehrenpokal der Luftwaffe (10 July 1941)
 Iron Cross (1939) 2nd and 1st Class
 Knight's Cross of the Iron Cross on 1 August 1941 as Oberfeldwebel and pilot in the 6./Jagdgeschwader 5

Notes

References

Citations

Bibliography

External links
TracesOfWar.com
Aces of the Luftwaffe
Luftwaffe 1939-1945

1918 births
2006 deaths
Military personnel from Koblenz
German World War II flying aces
People from the Rhine Province
Recipients of the Knight's Cross of the Iron Cross
German Air Force personnel